Jorge Rizo (born 21 September 1952) is a Cuban water polo player. He competed at the 1972 Summer Olympics, the 1976 Summer Olympics and the 1980 Summer Olympics.

References

1952 births
Living people
Cuban male water polo players
Olympic water polo players of Cuba
Water polo players at the 1972 Summer Olympics
Water polo players at the 1976 Summer Olympics
Water polo players at the 1980 Summer Olympics
Place of birth missing (living people)